Time Of My Life is a play by Alan Ayckbourn. It premiered at the Stephen Joseph Theatre in Scarborough on 21 April 1992 then in the West End on 3 August 1993.

It was revived by the author in the summer of 2013.

Plot

The play is set in three different periods of time in a small Italian restaurant in Northern England.

When Gerry Stratton plans a family meal out with his two grown up sons to celebrate his wife, Laura’s 54th birthday and proposes an almost prophetic toast to ‘happy times’, he has no idea of the events that will unfold over the course of that evening. Their elder son, Glyn (played by John Pickard), is now back together with his long-suffering wife Stephanie, and their younger son, Adam has brought along his new girlfriend, an outrageous hairdresser, to meet the Stratton family for the first time.

Family skeletons intrude on cheerful domesticity as we get a glimpse of Glyn and Stephanie’s story unfolding in the future scenes. Meanwhile at another table in the same restaurant, Adam and Maureen’s story is played out in reverse chronology, with Gerry and Laura remaining in the present time unpicking their marriage and recalling first love.

The original London production ran at The Vaudeville for twelve weeks in 1993 after its premier in Scarborough and received these excellent reviews:
“Immensely subtle; ingenious” - The Guardian
“Funny, very funny, and not at all funny; quintessentially Ayckbourn” - The Times

It was revived last year under Ayckbourn’s direction at regional theatres but despite an Off-Broadway production, it never had a London run. However it will be revived in March 2015 at The Tabard Theatre in London. 
Law Ballard directs the cast featuring John Pickard as Glyn (known for his role as Dominic Reilly in Hollyoaks and David Porter in BBC Sitcom; 2point4 Children).

Cast
Gerry Stratton, head of a builders' firm
Laura Stratton, Gerry's wife
Glyn Stratton, their elder son
Adam Stratton, their younger son
Stephanie, Glyn's wife
Maureen, Adam's girlfriend
Calvinu, Tuto, Aggi, Bengie, Dinka- waiters in the restaurant, all played by the same actor

External links
Ayckbourn homepage

Plays by Alan Ayckbourn
1992 plays
Plays set in England